is a city located in Sorachi Subprefecture, Hokkaido, Japan. As of September 2016, the city has an estimated population of 9,056, and the density of 30 persons per km2.

Geography
The total area is 302.64 km2. It is bordered on three sides by mountains, and on its east side is the man-made Lake Katsurazawa.

History
Mikasa is one of the birthplaces of the mining and railroad industries in Hokkaido, and the Hokkai Bon song was invented there. Though in the past it flourished due to its natural abundance of coal, the mines have largely closed down and this has caused the population of the city to fall rapidly.

Quite a few fossil specimens have also been collected there, particularly ammonites and the prehistoric marine reptile Yezosaurus mikasaensis, both of which can be viewed at the city's natural history museum.

1906 - Mikasayama village was founded.
1942 - Mikasayama village became Mikasa town.
1957 - Mikasa town became Mikasa city.

Education

High school
 Hokkaido Mikasa High School.

Transportation
Hokkaidō Expressway runs through west of the city and Mikasa IC is on it. No railway is in the city.

Agriculture
Notable local products include watermelon, musk melon, cucumber, northern plum, and wine.

Culture

Mascot
He is a 84,000,000-year-old yellow dinosaur.

Personalities
Tadashi Kawamata (b. 1953), artist

See also
Mikasa City Museum

References

External links 

 Official Website 

 
Cities in Hokkaido